Chris Appelhans is an American illustrator, production designer, and film director born in Idaho. His independent artistic work appears in galleries around the United States. He is known for illustrating two children's books, A Greyhound, A Groundhog and Sparky. He won the Children's Choice Book Award in 2015. He is also the writer and director of the 2021 film Wish Dragon.

In 2012, he married author Maurene Goo, with whom he resides in Los Angeles. Their son was born in 2020.

Filmography

References 

https://www.imdb.com/name/nm2282774/?ref_=tt_ov_dr

Year of birth missing (living people)
Living people
American children's book illustrators
Film directors from Idaho

Further reading 
A Greyhound, A Groundhog
 
 
 
 
''Sparky!